Timm Klose (born 9 May 1988) is a Swiss professional footballer who plays as a centre back, most recently for Championship club Bristol City and the Switzerland national team.

Born in Frankfurt to a German father and Swiss mother, he was raised in Switzerland from the age of five. After playing in the youth teams of BSC Old Boys and FC Basel, he moved to FC Thun in 2009, and two years later joined the German club 1. FC Nürnberg. He played for VfL Wolfsburg from 2013 until he joined Norwich in 2016, where he has since made over 100 appearances. In January 2022, Klose signed for EFL Championship side Bristol City.

Klose made his full international debut for Switzerland in 2011, and as of June 2020 has 17 caps. He also played for the Switzerland Olympic team at London 2012.

Club career

Early career
Klose started his youth football with BSC Old Boys in 1993 and moved to FC Basel youth for the season 2003–2004. He returned to OB after that one season. In the summer 2007 he again moved to FCB and advanced to their U21 team in the third tier of Swiss football, playing 47 games and scoring 3 goals in his two seasons with the club. Klose had played in four test games for Basel's first team and wanted to advance to them for their 2009–10 season, but manager at that time was Thorsten Fink and he wanted Klose to wait another year. Klose decided to move on.

Klose made 29 appearances as FC Thun won the 2009–10 Swiss Challenge League, scoring in a 4–0 home win over FC Gossau on 5 December. He made 30 appearances in the following season in the Super League, scoring three times.

On 28 May 2011, he left Thun for 1. FC Nürnberg on a three-year deal for around €400,000. He made 13 league appearances from August to November, and then 8 from March to May with the reserves in the Regionalliga Bayern; he scored the only goal on 8 May against FC Ingolstadt 04 II. The following season he returned to the first team, and scored twice in 32 Bundesliga appearances.

VfL Wolfsburg
On 1 July 2013, Klose signed for VfL Wolfsburg on a four-year contract. He was sent off on his Wolfsburg debut, a 2–0 away defeat to rivals Hannover 96 on 10 August, and only played 9 more league games throughout the season, with just 4 more as a starter. However, he played the full 90 minutes as Wolfsburg won the DFB-Pokal for the first time with a 3–1 victory over Borussia Dortmund on 30 May 2015.

Norwich City

On 18 January 2016, Klose signed for Premier League side Norwich City on a three-and-a-half-year contract for an undisclosed fee. He made his debut on 2 February in a 3–0 home loss to Tottenham Hotspur, and totalled ten games for the relegated Canaries, scoring to open a 3–2 win over Newcastle United at Carrow Road on 2 April.

In 2018–19, Klose played 31 times as Norwich won the EFL Championship and scored four goals, including both of a 2–1 win at Nottingham Forest on 20 October 2018. He signed a new three-year contract on 20 May 2019, tying him to the club until 2022.

Klose suffered a posterior cruciate ligament injury to his right knee on 27 August 2019, as Norwich were eliminated from the EFL Cup by Crawley Town. He did not return until the following 19 June, when he played a 3–0 home loss to Southampton following the COVID-19 hiatus. Eight days later, he was sent off for the first time for Norwich, when he pulled down Odion Ighalo in a 2–1 home extra-time loss to Manchester United in the sixth round of the FA Cup.

Basel
On 7 October 2020 FC Basel announced that they had reached an agreement with Norwich and that Klose had signed in on a loan contract until the end of the season. After playing in two test games Klose played his domestic league debut for his new club in the away game in the Stadion Wankdorf in Bern on 21 November 2020 as Basel were defeated 1–2 by Swiss reigning champions Young Boys. He scored his first goal for his club in the home game in the St. Jakob-Park on 9 December 2020. It was the first goal of the game and Basel went on to win 4–2 against Sion.

Basel played one of their worst seasons in this campaign and the 2020–21 Swiss Cup match in their own St. Jakob-Park against lower tier Winterthur on 17 February 2021 resulted in a debacle. The outsiders went into an early lead and added a second just before half time. Directly after the break FCW played as they wished with the FCB defence and added three more goals within 10 minutes. The end score was 6–2. This is the highest number of goals that the team has conceded in their home stadium since it was opened on 15 March 2001. Klose played the entire match and he and the entire back four received a lot of criticism after the match.

The return to Klose's club of origin was sportingly not a lucky one. Klose could not bring the sporting performance that had been expected. On 22 May 2021 the club announced that Klose's contract that would expire 30 June 2021 would not be renewed and that he would return to Norwich. In his one season with the club Klose played a total of 37 games for Basel scoring a total of two goals. 28 of these games were in the Swiss Super League, one in the Swiss Cup and eight were friendly games. He scored both his goals in the domestic league.

Bristol City
Klose signed for Championship club Bristol City on 27 January 2022, joining as a free transfer. He played his first game for the club in the EFL Championship which was against Preston North End which ended in 2–2 draw on the 29th January 2022. 

In June 2022 he signed a new one year contract at Ashton Gate with a further one year option. 
In January 2023, Klose left Bristol City by mutual agreement.

International career
He was named in the Team of the Tournament at the 2011 UEFA European Under-21 Championship in which his country reached the final. He also represented Switzerland at the 2012 Olympics, and played every match as Switzerland were eliminated in last place in Group B.

He made his full international debut for Switzerland on 10 August 2011, replacing Philippe Senderos in the 57th minute of a 2–1 away friendly win against Liechtenstein. On 7 October he played his first competitive international and start, as Switzerland lost a Euro 2012 qualifier 2–0 away to Wales. He also played two matches in the team's successful 2014 FIFA World Cup qualification, but was not selected for the tournament.

An injury sustained by Klose while playing for Norwich City in April 2016, ultimately led to him missing selection for Euro 2016.

Klose's last international appearance was on 18 November 2018 as Switzerland won 5–2 against Belgium in the 2018–19 UEFA Nations League A.

Career statistics

Honours
FC Thun
Swiss Challenge League: 2009–10

VfL Wolfsburg
DFB-Pokal: 2014–15
DFL-Supercup: 2015

Norwich City
EFL Championship: 2018–19
Switzerland U21
UEFA European Under-21 Championship runner-up:2011

References

External links

Timm Klose at football.ch  

1988 births
Living people
Footballers from Frankfurt
Swiss men's footballers
Swiss Challenge League players
Swiss Super League players
Bundesliga players
Premier League players
English Football League players
FC Thun players
1. FC Nürnberg players
1. FC Nürnberg II players
VfL Wolfsburg players
Norwich City F.C. players
FC Basel players
Bristol City F.C. players
Association football defenders
Footballers at the 2012 Summer Olympics
Olympic footballers of Switzerland
Switzerland under-21 international footballers
Switzerland international footballers
Swiss expatriate footballers
Swiss expatriate sportspeople in Germany
Swiss expatriate sportspeople in England
Expatriate footballers in Germany
Expatriate footballers in England